The Southeastern Oklahoma State Savage Storm (also Southeastern Savage Storm and SOSU Savage Storm), formerly known as the Savages until 2006, are the athletic teams that represent Southeastern Oklahoma State University, located in Durant, Oklahoma, in NCAA Division II intercollegiate sports. The Savage Storm compete as members of the Great American Conference for all 10 varsity sports.

Varsity teams

List of teams

Men's sports
 Baseball
 Basketball
 Football
 Golf
 Rodeo
 Tennis

Women's sports
 Basketball
 Cross Country
 Rodeo
 Softball
 Tennis
 Volleyball

National championships

Team (1)

Individual sports

Baseball

Southeastern's Baseball team has made 11 College World Series appearances, has had the most (66) All-American honors of any college baseball program in the state of Oklahoma, and 64 players have gone on to play professionally. The 2000 team won the NCAA Division II Baseball National Championship.

Alumni
 Brett Butler, major league baseball player
 Daren Brown, major league baseball coach in the Seattle Mariners organization
 Jeff Frye, major league baseball player
 Earnest Hunter, former NFL Running back for the Cleveland Browns, Baltimore Ravens and New Orleans Saints
 Kirby Minter, member of the 1950 US FIBA World championship basketball team
 Crystal Robinson, professional basketball player
 Dennis Rodman, Hall of Fame basketball player, celebrity
 Jerry Shipp, captain and leading scorer of the 1964 Gold Medal Olympic men's basketball team
 Randall Burks, former Chicago Bears wide receiver
 Bridger Dauenhauer, Former college baseball journeyman/ Musician
 Codey McElroy, currently Tight end for the Tampa Bay Buccaneers in the NFL

References

External links